William Lester may refer to:

Bill Lester (born 1961), American racing driver
William A. Lester, Jr. (born 1937), American chemist
William Otis Lester (1864–1927), American politician and school administrator
MS William Lester